John Jay O'Connor III (January 10, 1930 – November 11, 2009) was an American lawyer and the husband of United States Supreme Court Associate Justice Sandra Day O'Connor, the first woman to serve on the court. O'Connor, a prominent lawyer in Arizona, suffered from Alzheimer's disease during his later life.  His illness played a significant role in Sandra Day O'Connor's decision to retire from the Supreme Court in 2005.

Life and career
O'Connor was born on January 10, 1930, in San Francisco, California. His parents were John Jay O'Connor II and Sally Flynn O'Connor. He was of Irish Catholic descent and attended St. Ignatius High School in San Francisco. He obtained his bachelor's degree from Stanford University in 1951, and later received a law degree, also from Stanford, in 1953.

O'Connor met his future wife, Sandra Day of Arizona, while both were law review editors and students at Stanford Law School. The couple married in 1952.

O'Connor served within the U.S. Army Judge Advocate General's Corp following his graduation from law school. He was stationed in Frankfurt, West Germany, from 1954 until 1956. Mrs O'Connor was employed in the Quartermaster Corps as a civilian lawyer.

O'Connor returned to the United States and moved to Phoenix, Arizona.  There he joined the law firm of Fennemore, Craig, von Ammon, McClennen & Udall. Following Sandra Day O'Connor's appointment to the United States Supreme Court by President Ronald Reagan, O'Connor moved with his family to Washington, D.C.  He continued to practice law with two firms, Miller & Chevalier and Bryan Cave, while living in Washington.

O'Connor was diagnosed with Alzheimer's nearly twenty years before his death. His deteriorating health played a significant role in Sandra Day O'Connor's decision to retire from the Supreme Court in 2005.

O'Connor died of Alzheimer's disease on November 11, 2009, in Phoenix, Arizona, at the age of 79.

References

External links
Los Angeles Times: John J. O'Connor III dies at 79; attorney and husband of former Supreme Court Justice Sandra Day O'Connor

1930 births
2009 deaths
20th-century American lawyers
Spouses of Arizona politicians
Lawyers from Phoenix, Arizona
Lawyers from San Francisco
Military personnel from California
Stanford University alumni
Neurological disease deaths in Arizona
Deaths from Alzheimer's disease
Sandra Day O'Connor